Stefan Wong (born 22 September 1978) is a former Mr. Hong Kong contestant, and is currently an actor with Hong Kong's TVB.

Personal life
Wong was born in Hong Kong, but his family emigrated to France when he was five years old. Wong returned to Hong Kong after finishing his studies. His ancestors had migrated from China to Vietnam, and used the surname Huỳnh, the Vietnamese reading of the Chinese character pronounced Wong in Cantonese.

His brother, François Wong, also took part in Mr. Hong Kong, and became a TVB artiste before becoming an accountant. In 2011, Wong opened a French restaurant in Hong Kong.

Wong married his fiancé Peggy in France on 3 August 2012.

Filmography

Television

Film

References

External links

1978 births
Hong Kong male television actors
Living people
TVB actors
Hong Kong male film actors
21st-century Hong Kong male actors
Hong Kong people of Hoa descent